Richard K. Hebard was a notable tennis and platform tennis player. He won the men's platform tennis title nine times (1947-48, 1951-52, 1955-57, 1963, 1965), and the Mixed Doubles three times (1953-55). He was inducted into the Platform Tennis Hall of Fame in 1965.

References

Year of birth missing (living people)
Living people
The Hill School alumni
Springfield College (Massachusetts) alumni
Platform tennis players
American male tennis players